Smarthistory is a free resource for the study of art history created by art historians Beth Harris and Steven Zucker. Smarthistory is an independent not-for-profit organization and the official partner of the Khan Academy for art history. It is funded by the National Endowment for the Humanities.

Smarthistory started in 2005 as an audio guide series for use at the Metropolitan Museum of Art, The Museum of Modern Art in New York City, and as a resource for students taking introductory art history courses at the college level. In addition to its focus on college-level courses in art history, Smarthistory supports the art history Advanced Placement course and examination developed by The College Board. Smarthistory provides essays, videos, photographs, and links to additional resources for all of the art and architecture that make up the AP art history curriculum.

Smarthistory has published more than 880 videos and 2,000 essays on art and cultural history from the Paleolithic era to the 21st century that include the art of Africa, the Americas, Asia, Europe, and Oceania. Smarthistory's essays have been contributed by more than 200 art historians, curators, and archaeologists writing in their areas of focus and are peer-reviewed. Videos are unscripted conversations between experts recorded on location in front of the original work of art or architecture.

In an article in the Brooklyn New York Daily News, staff writer Elizabeth Lazarowitz quotes Steven Zucker, "Art can be really intimidating for people", said Zucker. "If we can make art feel exciting and interesting and very much relevant to a historical moment...art can have real meaning." Unlike reading about art in a book, "the idea of the audio was to keep a student's eyes on the image", he explained. "It helped students to learn the material a lot better."

Awards & grants 
Smarthistory won the Webby Award for Education in 2009. The Samuel H. Kress Foundation gave them a $25,000 grant for development in 2008 and a $38,000 partnership development grant with the Portland Art Museum in 2009.

References

External links

Michelle Millar Fisher, Louis C. Madeira IV Assistant Curator of European Decorative Arts and Design, Philadelphia Museum of Art "Smarthistory," caa.reviews, May 23, 2018, published by the College Art Association
ARCHES (at risk cultural heritage education series)
Patrick Masson, "Smarthistory: No grand strategies needed, just openness," Opensource 5/02/2016
John Seed, "Is Smarthistory the Art History Textbook of the Future?," HuffPost 9/05/2012
"'Smarthistory' rethinks the art history textbook online", The Chronicle of Higher Education, 11/23/2010
PC Magazine: Top 100 Websites of 2009, 7/27/2009
"Daily Dose Pick: Smarthistory" Flavorpill, 7/09/2009
"Smarthistory and Portland Art Museum", May 2009
"Brooklyn-based art historians launch website with videos of masterpieces" New York Daily News, 2/25/2011

2005 establishments in New York City
Internet properties established in 2005
Art history
Educational organizations based in the United States
History websites of the United States
Non-profit organizations based in New York (state)